Chlamys asper is an extinct species of saltwater scallop, a fossil marine bivalve mollusc in the family Pectinidae, the scallops. This species was described by Sowerby in 1847 under the name Pecten asper. The fossils date from the period of the Pliocene to Pleistocene in Malaysia and Miocene in Indonesia.

References

asper
Molluscs described in 1994